Sergey Danilin (1 January 1960 – 4 October 2021) was a Soviet luger who competed from the early 1980s to the mid-1990s. Competing in four Winter Olympics, he earned the silver medal in the men's singles event at Sarajevo in 1984.

Danilin also won a complete set of medals in the men's singles event at the FIL World Luge Championships with a gold in 1981, a silver in 1983, and a bronze in 1987. He also won a pair of bronze medals in the mixed team event (1989, 1990). He also won two medals in the men's singles event at the FIL European Luge Championships with a gold in 1986 and a silver in 1982. His best finish in the overall men's singles Luge World Cup was second twice (1981-2, 1982-3).

Danilin married fellow Soviet luger Nadejda Danilina in 1986.

Danilin died on 4 October 2021, at the age of 61.

References

1988 luge men's singles results
1992 luge men's singles results
1994 luge men's singles results
DatabaseOlympics.com profile on Danilin.
Fuzilogik Sports - Winter Olympic results - Men's luge
Hickoksports.com results on Olympic champions in luge and skeleton.
Hickok sports information on World champions in luge and skeleton.
List of European luge champions 
List of men's singles luge World Cup champions since 1978.
New York Times November 16, 1987 article featuring Danilin

External links
 
 
 

1960 births
2021 deaths
Russian male lugers
Soviet male lugers
Olympic lugers of the Soviet Union
Olympic lugers of the Unified Team
Olympic lugers of Russia
Olympic silver medalists for the Soviet Union
Olympic medalists in luge
Lugers at the 1980 Winter Olympics
Lugers at the 1984 Winter Olympics
Lugers at the 1988 Winter Olympics
Lugers at the 1992 Winter Olympics
Lugers at the 1994 Winter Olympics
Medalists at the 1984 Winter Olympics
Sportspeople from Moscow